Liutuan is a town under the administration of Yanshou County, Heilongjiang, China. , it has 15 villages under its administration.

References 

Township-level divisions of Heilongjiang
Yanshou County